Tevahn Tyrell (born 16 March 1997) is a Bermudian professional footballer who plays for Durham City and the Bermuda national team. Besides Bermuda, he has played in England.

International career
In 2017, Tyrell debuted with the Bermudian U20s in a 1–1 draw against Trinidad and Tobago. In 2018, he made his senior debut in a 0–0 draw against Barbados. On 12 October 2018, he scored his first international goal against non-FIFA member Sint Maarten in a 12–0 victory during the qualifying matches of the CONCACAF Nations League.

Career statistics

International goals
Scores and results list Bermuda's goal tally first.

References

External links
 
 

1997 births
Living people
Bermuda international footballers
Bermuda under-20 international footballers
Bermudian footballers
Association football forwards